Jean-Baptiste Faribault (October 19, 1775 – August 20, 1860) was a trader with the Indians and early settler in Minnesota.

His father, Barthélemy Faribault, a lawyer of Paris, France, settled in Canada towards the middle of the 18th century and served as military secretary to the French army in Canada. After the occupation of the country by the English, he retired to private life in Berthier and he held the office of notary public.

Faribault was born in Berthier, Lower Canada, and received a good school education; after several years of mercantile employment in Quebec, he entered the fur trade, most probably in the employ of Parker, Gerrard, and Ogilvy. In May 1798, he went with others to the island of Michilimackinac or Mackinac, one of the depots of this company. For over ten years, he traded with the Pottowatomic Natives at Kankakee, with the Dakota or the Sioux, Natives at Redwood, on the Des Moines river, and at Little Rapids, on the Minnesota River just upstream of present-day Carver, Minnesota, on behalf of the Northwest Fur Company.

During his residence at Little Rapids, in 1805, he was married to Elizabeth Pelagie Ainse, a half-Dakota daughter of Joseph-Louis Ainse, a British superintendent at Mackinac. In 1809, he settled in the small village of Prairie du Chien, Wisconsin, and commenced trading, on his own account, with the Indians of the Winnebago, Fox, and Sioux tribes. In addition to that, he conducted an exchange of lead with Julien Dubuque, at the point now occupied by the city of that name.

During the War of 1812, Faribault refused to enlist in the British army, and suffered imprisonment and the loss of all his goods in consequence. After the conclusion of the war, in 1815, he became a citizen of the United States, and recommenced his trade at Prairie du Chien. In 1819, he removed to Pike Island in the Mississippi River, which his wife received ownership of under an 1820 treaty, and in 1826 to St. Peter (Mendota, Minnesota), opposite the military post of Fort Snelling. There he remained until the last years of his life, which were spent with his children in the town of Faribault, Minnesota, which is named for his eldest son. Faribault County in southern Minnesota was named after Jean-Baptiste.

He was much attached to the Roman Catholic faith of his childhood and presented a house for a chapel to Father Lucien Galtier, the first resident missionary in Minnesota (1840). He died at Faribault, Minnesota, on August 20, 1860.

References

External links
Biography at the Dictionary of Canadian Biography Online

1775 births
1860 deaths
Canadian fur traders
Pre-Confederation Quebec people
French Quebecers
People from Mendota, Minnesota
People from Prairie du Chien, Wisconsin